The Leo Awards are the awards program for the British Columbia film and television industry. Held each May or June in Vancouver, British Columbia, Canada, the Leo Awards were founded by the Motion Picture Arts and Sciences Foundation of British Columbia in 1999. Awards categories are numerous, and include but are not exclusive to live action, animated, adult dramatic, children's, documentary film, documentary television, feature films, short films.

Event history
The British Columbia film and television industry provides more than 25,000 jobs and generates more than $2 billion (Canadian) in economic activity each year, making the industry an integral one to the economic and social vitality of British Columbia. The Leos were established to provide support and recognition for the work of film and television producers, writers, directors, performers and others.

In 2005, the Leo Awards Film Festival was added to the event as a means of showcasing the best in film and television production honored at the festival. However, due to limited financial resources, the festival was cancelled in 2010.

Award categories
Awards are given to films released in the prior calendar year. The Leos also honor a group and/or an individual for outstanding achievement. In 2010, the awards were given in 75 categories, of which 62 were technical or craft awards. In 2012, the organization created three new categories of award: best performance (voice) in an animation program or series; best casting in a feature-length drama; and best casting in a dramatic series. The award categories include:

Motion Picture

Television Movie

Short Drama

Dramatic Series

Feature Length Documentary

Short Documentary Program

Documentary Series

Information, Lifestyle or Reality Program or Series

Music, Comedy or Variety Program or Series

Animation Program or Series

Youth or Children's Program or Series

Web Series

Music Video

Student Production

See also

 Canadian television awards

References

Bibliography
Turner, Barry. The Connected Screenwriter: A Comprehensive Guide to the U.S. and International Studios, Networks, Production Companies, and Filmmakers That Want to Buy Your Screenplay. New York: St. Martin's Griffin, 2009.

External links
 

Canadian film awards
Canadian television awards
Cinema of British Columbia
British Columbia awards
Awards established in 1999
1999 establishments in British Columbia